V. G. Narayanan is an Indian-born American economist. He is the Thomas D. Casserly, Jr. Professor of Business Administration Chair at Harvard Business School. He is the author of two self-published books, and the author of many research articles.

Early life
Narayanan attended PSBB Senior Secondary School, Chennai, and subsequently graduated from the University of Madras in 1988. Post that he completed his PGDM from Indian Institute of Management Ahmedabad in 1990 and subsequently earned a PhD in Business from the Stanford Graduate School of Business in 1995.

Career
Narayanan joined the Harvard Business School as a faculty member in 1994. He is now the Thomas D. Casserly, Jr. Professor of Business Administration Chair.

Narayanan is the author of two self-published books, and the author of many research articles.

References

Year of birth missing (living people)
Living people
University of Madras alumni
Stanford Graduate School of Business alumni
Harvard Business School faculty
American economists